Mangaia Airport  is an airport on Mangaia in the Cook Islands. In 2007, the airport received $5 million for development.

Airlines and destinations

The Air Rarotonga Rarotonga connection is operated three days a week.

References

External links
Mangaia Terminal Image

Airports in the Cook Islands
Mangaia